is a yaoi manga by Mika Sadahiro about two prisoners, Sen and Swordfish, who try to survive the notorious prison "Under Grand Hotel".  It is published by 801 Media in English, although at one point, Tokyopop offered a license.

Reception
Briana Lawrence was shocked by the manga, appreciating the brutality of the setting, highlighting that the rape scenes are not an unrealistic rape fantasy.  She found that the series was extremely condensed and hard-hitting all the time.  Melinda Beasi describes the manga as being intense, melodramatic and deeply unbelievable, and appreciates the masculine character designs.  Sandra Scholes feels that it is gritty and dark.

References

External links

2003 manga
Digital Manga Publishing titles
Futabasha manga
Yaoi anime and manga